The 1942–43 New York Rangers season was the franchise's 17th season. During the regular season, the Rangers posted an 11–31–8 record and finished with 30 points. The Rangers finished in last place in the NHL.

Regular season

Final standings

Record vs. opponents

Schedule and results

|- align="center" bgcolor="#FFBBBB"
| 1 || 31 || @ Toronto Maple Leafs || 7–2 || 0–1–0
|-

|- align="center" bgcolor="#FFBBBB"
| 2 || 5 || @ Detroit Red Wings || 12–5 || 0–2–0
|- align="center" bgcolor="#CCFFCC"
| 3 || 7 || Montreal Canadiens || 4 – 3 OT || 1–2–0
|- align="center" bgcolor="#FFBBBB"
| 4 || 8 || @ Montreal Canadiens || 10–4 || 1–3–0
|- align="center" bgcolor="#CCFFCC"
| 5 || 10 || Chicago Black Hawks || 5 – 3 OT || 2–3–0
|- align="center" bgcolor="#FFBBBB"
| 6 || 14 || @ Boston Bruins || 5–3 || 2–4–0
|- align="center" bgcolor="#FFBBBB"
| 7 || 15 || Boston Bruins || 4–3 || 2–5–0
|- align="center" bgcolor="#FFBBBB"
| 8 || 19 || Toronto Maple Leafs || 7–3 || 2–6–0
|- align="center" bgcolor="white"
| 9 || 22 || Detroit Red Wings || 4–4 || 2–6–1
|- align="center" bgcolor="#CCFFCC"
| 10 || 26 || @ Chicago Black Hawks || 2–1 || 3–6–1
|- align="center" bgcolor="#FFBBBB"
| 11 || 28 || @ Toronto Maple Leafs || 8–6 || 3–7–1
|- align="center" bgcolor="#CCFFCC"
| 12 || 29 || Boston Bruins || 3–2 || 4–7–1
|-

|- align="center" bgcolor="#FFBBBB"
| 13 || 3 || @ Chicago Black Hawks || 3–1 || 4–8–1
|- align="center" bgcolor="#FFBBBB"
| 14 || 6 || @ Boston Bruins || 5–4 || 4–9–1
|- align="center" bgcolor="#FFBBBB"
| 15 || 13 || Montreal Canadiens || 7–3 || 4–10–1
|- align="center" bgcolor="#FFBBBB"
| 16 || 17 || Boston Bruins || 7–3 || 4–11–1
|- align="center" bgcolor="white"
| 17 || 19 || @ Montreal Canadiens || 1–1 || 4–11–2
|- align="center" bgcolor="#FFBBBB"
| 18 || 20 || Toronto Maple Leafs || 8–2 || 4–12–2
|- align="center" bgcolor="#CCFFCC"
| 19 || 25 || @ Detroit Red Wings || 3–1 || 5–12–2
|- align="center" bgcolor="#CCFFCC"
| 20 || 27 || Toronto Maple Leafs || 3–1 || 6–12–2
|- align="center" bgcolor="#CCFFCC"
| 21 || 29 || @ Boston Bruins || 5–3 || 7–12–2
|- align="center" bgcolor="#FFBBBB"
| 22 || 31 || Detroit Red Wings || 2–0 || 7–13–2
|-

|- align="center" bgcolor="#FFBBBB"
| 23 || 1 || @ Chicago Black Hawks || 6–5 || 7–14–2
|- align="center" bgcolor="white"
| 24 || 3 || Chicago Black Hawks || 3–3 || 7–14–3
|- align="center" bgcolor="white"
| 25 || 7 || @ Detroit Red Wings || 2–2 || 7–14–4
|- align="center" bgcolor="#FFBBBB"
| 26 || 10 || Montreal Canadiens || 7–4 || 7–15–4
|- align="center" bgcolor="#FFBBBB"
| 27 || 14 || Detroit Red Wings || 4–1 || 7–16–4
|- align="center" bgcolor="#FFBBBB"
| 28 || 16 || @ Boston Bruins || 7–5 || 7–17–4
|- align="center" bgcolor="#FFBBBB"
| 29 || 17 || Boston Bruins || 6–3 || 7–18–4
|- align="center" bgcolor="#FFBBBB"
| 30 || 21 || @ Toronto Maple Leafs || 7–4 || 7–19–4
|- align="center" bgcolor="white"
| 31 || 23 || @ Montreal Canadiens || 5–5 || 7–19–5
|- align="center" bgcolor="#FFBBBB"
| 32 || 24 || @ Detroit Red Wings || 7–0 || 7–20–5
|- align="center" bgcolor="#FFBBBB"
| 33 || 28 || @ Chicago Black Hawks || 10–1 || 7–21–5
|- align="center" bgcolor="#FFBBBB"
| 34 || 31 || Boston Bruins || 7–2 || 7–22–5
|-

|- align="center" bgcolor="white"
| 35 || 4 || Chicago Black Hawks || 1–1 || 7–22–6
|- align="center" bgcolor="#FFBBBB"
| 36 || 6 || @ Toronto Maple Leafs || 3–2 || 7–23–6
|- align="center" bgcolor="#FFBBBB"
| 37 || 7 || @ Chicago Black Hawks || 8–4 || 7–24–6
|- align="center" bgcolor="white"
| 38 || 14 || Toronto Maple Leafs || 4–4 || 7–24–7
|- align="center" bgcolor="#FFBBBB"
| 39 || 18 || Detroit Red Wings || 5–4 || 7–25–7
|- align="center" bgcolor="#FFBBBB"
| 40 || 20 || @ Montreal Canadiens || 6–1 || 7–26–7
|- align="center" bgcolor="#CCFFCC"
| 41 || 21 || Montreal Canadiens || 6–1 || 8–26–7
|- align="center" bgcolor="#CCFFCC"
| 42 || 25 || Chicago Black Hawks || 7–4 || 9–26–7
|- align="center" bgcolor="#FFBBBB"
| 43 || 27 || @ Detroit Red Wings || 7–1 || 9–27–7
|- align="center" bgcolor="#FFBBBB"
| 44 || 28 || Detroit Red Wings || 5–1 || 9–28–7
|-

|- align="center" bgcolor="#CCFFCC"
| 45 || 2 || @ Toronto Maple Leafs || 4–0 || 10–28–7
|- align="center" bgcolor="#FFBBBB"
| 46 || 4 || Montreal Canadiens || 7–2 || 10–29–7
|- align="center" bgcolor="white"
| 47 || 7 || Toronto Maple Leafs || 5–5 || 10–29–8
|- align="center" bgcolor="#CCFFCC"
| 48 || 14 || Chicago Black Hawks || 7–5 || 11–29–8
|- align="center" bgcolor="#FFBBBB"
| 49 || 16 || @ Boston Bruins || 11–5 || 11–30–8
|- align="center" bgcolor="#FFBBBB"
| 50 || 18 || @ Montreal Canadiens || 6–3 || 11–31–8
|-

Playoffs
The Rangers finished last in the NHL and failed to qualify for the 1943 Stanley Cup playoffs.

Player statistics
Skaters

Goaltenders

†Denotes player spent time with another team before joining Rangers. Stats reflect time with Rangers only.
‡Traded mid-season. Stats reflect time with Rangers only.

See also 
 1942–43 NHL season

References 

New York Rangers seasons
New York Rangers
New York Rangers
New York Rangers
New York Rangers
Madison Square Garden
1940s in Manhattan